Luís Miguel Rodrigues Monteiro (born 22 January 1983) is a Portuguese former swimmer, who specialized in freestyle events. He is a fourth-place finalist in the 200 m freestyle (1:52.33) at the 2001 European Junior Swimming Championships in Valletta, Malta. Monteiro is a member of the swimming team for Football Club Porto, and is trained by long-time coach and mentor Rui Sardinha.

Monteiro qualified for two swimming events at the 2004 Summer Olympics in Athens, by clearing a FINA B-cut of 1:50.93 (200 m freestyle) from the World Championships in Barcelona, Spain. In the 200 m freestyle, Monteiro challenged seven other swimmers on the fifth heat, including three-time Olympian Jacob Carstensen of Denmark. He touched out Poland's Łukasz Drzewiński to take a fifth spot and twenty-ninth overall by 0.12 of a second in 1:51.78. He also teamed up with Adriano Niz, João Araújo, and Miguel Pires in the 4 × 200 m freestyle relay. Swimming the lead-off leg in heat one, Monteiro set his own personal best of 1:50.43, but the Portuguese team settled only for seventh place and fourteenth overall in a new national record of 7:27.99.

Notes

References

External links 
 
 

1983 births
Living people
Portuguese male freestyle swimmers
Olympic swimmers of Portugal
Swimmers at the 2004 Summer Olympics
Sportspeople from Vila Nova de Gaia
20th-century Portuguese people
21st-century Portuguese people